Viganella is a frazione of Borgomezzavalle, a comune (municipality) in the Province of Verbano-Cusio-Ossola in the Italian region Piedmont, located about  northeast of Turin and about  northwest of Verbania.  It was a separate comune until 2016, when it was merged with Seppiana into the municipality of Borgomezzavalle.
 
Winter lighting
For its extreme landscape position, the town remains shadowed for 83 days per year, between November and January. The mirror functions as a heliostat, tracking the Sun so that sunlight always reflects onto the town square.BBC picture The mirror cost €100,000, or approximately €540 per resident.

The town was featured in a 2009 Italian/Canadian film called Lo Specchio (The Mirror'').

According to a former mayor: "The idea behind the project doesn't have a scientific basis, but a human one. It comes from a desire to let people socialise in winter when the town shuts down due to the cold and the dark."

See also

 Rjukan, a town in Norway also uses mirrors to illuminate the town.

References

External links
 Trailer for 'Lo Specchio'
 Articles about Lighting Solution: Article 1, Article 2

Frazioni of Borgomezzavalle
Former municipalities of the Province of Verbano-Cusio-Ossola

Cities and towns in Piedmont